The International Habitation Module, International Habitat or I-HAB is designed as the main habitat module of the Lunar Gateway station, to be built by the European Space Agency (ESA) in collaboration with the Japan Aerospace Exploration Agency, or JAXA. The addition of the I-HAB and the Habitation and Logistics Outpost (HALO) module will provide a combined  of habitable volume to the station.

Background 
Concept work on the I-HAB module started in early July 2018 with a consortium of companies lead by Airbus and including Thales Alenia Space. Airbus-lead consortium worked with ESA to develop an overall design concept. Airbus and Thales Alenia were also independently contracted in September 2018 to run parallel Phase A/B studies. Phase A focused on establishing the program's feasibility, and Phase B looked to develop a preliminary definition for the module. ESA conducted a Preliminary Requirements Review in November 2018 and the consortium ran its own design meeting in March 2019. This culminated in the development and publication of the System Requirements Document in July 2019, which was built on NASA's requirements for Lunar Gateway.

On 14 October 2020, Thales Alenia announced that they had been selected by ESA to build the I-HAB module. The company will be the prime contractor, responsible for program management, design, fabrication of the primary structure, mechanical and thermal systems, and final integration and testing. Thales Alenia previously built several modules for the International Space Station (ISS), including Columbus, Harmony, Tranquility, Leonardo, and the Cupola. It was the second largest industrial provider to the ISS. It also built the pressure vessels for the Automated Transfer Vehicle (ATV) and Cygnus spacecraft; and the Multi-Purpose Logistics Modules, which were used to transport cargo inside the Space Shuttle orbiters. The expected total cost of the contract with Thales Alenia will be 327 million euros, with the first tranches of payments equal to 36 million euros.

ESA formalised their involvement in the Lunar Gateway on October 27, 2020, with an agreement with NASA.

Design 
Mission requirements for module specified the need to provide habitation and working space for four astronauts for a duration of 30 to 90 days. I-HAB will feature four docking ports, two axial ports for connection to other Lunar Gateway elements, and two radial ports for cargo vehicle and lunar lander vehicle. Due to Lunar Gateway not being permanently inhabited, the module will be optimised for remote operation and maintenance, which may be achieved through the use of internal robotic interfaces and a robotic arm.

The module aims to provide galley facilities; hygiene and waste management systems; exercise equipment; cargo and consumables storage; refrigeration; airlocks; and workstations, monitor, and control consoles. Various elements of the module are contributions from partners. Environmental control and life support system, batteries, thermal control, and imagery components will be built and supplied by JAXA; avionics hardware and software will be supplied by US National Aeronautics and Space Administration (NASA); and robotic interfaces will be provided by the Canadian Space Agency (CSA).

I-HAB will feature four docking ports. Two axial ports will be used for connection to other Lunar Gateway elements, including the Habitation and Logistics Outpost and airlock. Two radial docking ports will be used for connection to the European System Providing Refueling, Infrastructure and Telecommunications (ESPRIT) module and for accommodating visiting cargo vehicles, Orion spacecraft and lunar lander.

While I-HAB is still planned to launch on NASA's Space Launch System, the size and weight of the module were constrained by the possibility of its launch vehicle being switched to SpaceX's Falcon Heavy. The inner diameter was reduced from 4.2 meters to 3.4 meters, and internal length reduced from 6.6 meters to 5.9 meters. Both reductions resulted from a smaller payload fairing, the need for a separate service vehicle to replace the transport service provided by the Orion spacecraft, and docking targets for the radial ports.

ESA planned to complete the first preliminary design review of the I-HAB in mid-2021. In preparation for this review, Thales Alenia partnered with the European Astronaut Centre to allow ESA astronauts to experience the usable volume and crew accommodations within the habitat. This was achieved via virtual reality.

Launch
The module is slated to launch in 2028 on the Artemis 4 mission with the Space Launch System Block 1B rocket, along with a crewed Orion spacecraft. The module would be located within a Universal Stage Adapter (USA), and attached to a payload adapter connected to an Exploration Upper Stage (EUS). Once the translunar injection burn has been completed the Orion/EUS stack will undergo a procedure similar to the transposition and docking procedure performed during the Apollo Program, during this procedure the Orion spacecraft would separate from the USA, after which the EUS rotates away from the Orion spacecraft to allow for the jettison of the USA. The EUS would then rotate back for Orion to dock with the I-HAB module. Following a successful docking, the EUS would then release the I-HAB module from the payload adaptor along with the Orion spacecraft attached. Orion would then be responsible for delivery of the module to the Lunar Gateway in its near-rectilinear halo orbit.

References

Lunar Gateway
2028 in spaceflight
Artemis program
Crewed spacecraft
Joint ventures
Missions to the Moon
NASA programs
NASA space stations
Spacecraft using halo orbits
Proposed space stations